Uthongathi FC are a South African club based in oThongathi, KwaZulu-Natal. Their current home stadium is the Princess Magogo Stadium in KwaMashu. They currently play in the South African National First Division.

History

The team was founded in 2014. In the 2016–17 season Uthongathi won the KZN ABC Motsepe League and gained promotion to the National First Division via a 1-0 play-off victory in the final against Super Eagles FC. In 2018 the chairman, Nicholas Mkhize, was shot dead after the club's weekly technical meeting.

Current squad

References

External links
 

 
Soccer clubs in South Africa
National First Division clubs
Association football clubs established in 2014
2014 establishments in South Africa